Patek Philippe SA is a Swiss luxury watch and clock manufacturer, located in the Canton of Geneva and the Vallée de Joux. Established in 1839, it is named after two of its founders, Antoni Patek and Adrien Philippe. Since 1932, the company has been owned by the Stern family in Switzerland and remains the last family-owned independent watch manufacturer in Geneva. Patek Philippe is one of the oldest watch manufacturers in the world with an uninterrupted watchmaking history since its founding. It designs and manufactures timepieces as well as movements, including some of the most complicated mechanical watches. The company maintains over 400 retail locations globally and over a dozen distribution centers across Asia, Europe, North America, and Oceania. In 2001, it opened the Patek Philippe Museum in Geneva.

Patek Philippe is widely considered to be one of the most prestigious watch manufacturers in the world.  As of December 2020, among the world's top ten most expensive watches ever sold at auctions, eight are Patek Philippe watches. In particular, Patek Philippe Grandmaster Chime Ref. 6300A-010 currently holds the title of the most expensive watch (and wristwatch) ever sold at auction (US$31.19 million/31 million CHF), while Patek Philippe Henry Graves Supercomplication, the world's most complicated mechanical watch until 1989, currently holds the title of the most expensive pocket watch ever sold at auction (US$24 million/23,237,000 CHF).

History

Early history  

The company traces its origins to the mid-19th century, when Polish watchmaker Antoni Patek along with his Czech-born Polish partner Franciszek Czapek formed Patek, Czapek & Cie in Geneva on 1 May 1839 and started manufacturing pocket watches. The two eventually separated due to disagreements and the company was liquidated on 18 April 1845. On 1 May 1845, Czapek founded Czapek & Cie with a new partner, Juliusz Gruzewski. Subsequently, Patek was joined by French watchmaker Adrien Philippe, the inventor of the keyless winding mechanism (although this has been discovered previously by Abraham Louis Breguet but not patented by him), and continued the watchmaking business with a new company, Patek & Cie, beginning on 15 May 1845.

On 1 January 1851, the company's name was officially changed to Patek, Philippe & Cie. In the same year, Queen Victoria of the United Kingdom acquired a keyless pendant watch at the Great Exhibition in London. The watch was embellished with rose-cut diamonds set in the pattern of a bouquet of flowers. The Queen had another exclusive Patek Philippe timepiece, to be worn pinned to clothing. This watch was suspended from a diamond and enamel brooch. In 1868, Patek Philippe created the first Swiss wristwatch for Countess Koscowicz of Hungary.

In March 1877, Antoni Patek died at the age of 65, but his only son, Léon Mecyslas Vincent, did not join the business. As a result, Joseph Antoine Bénassy-Philippe, one of Adrien Philippe's sons-in-law, succeeded Antoni Patek's position. In 1887, the cross of one of the 4 Military Orders of Spain, the Order of Calatrava, became the registered company logo of Patek Philippe as a sympathetic allusion to the still extant order of Catholic knights that fought the Muslims in the Crusades. In 1891, the 76-year-old Adrien Philippe handed over his position in the business to his youngest son Joseph Emile Philippe, together with Francois Antoine Conty. Adrien Philippe died in January 1894.

Company restructuring 
1901 saw the transformation of Patek Philippe into a joint-stock company, Ancienne Manufacture d'horlogerie Patek, Philippe & Cie, Société Anonyme, initiated by J. A. Bénassy-Philippe and Joseph E. Philippe. Still being run as a family business, Patek Philippe then had seven shareholders, five of whom formed the board of directors with J. A. Bénassy-Philippe being the chairman. Joseph E. Philippe's son later joined the company, and he was the last offspring of the founders in the business. In 1915, Albert Einstein ordered a gold pocket watch from Patek Philippe; in that year, he completed his Theory of General Relativity.

The Swiss Stern family has owned Patek Philippe since 1932 when Charles Stern and Jean Stern acquired the company during the Great Depression. The Stern brothers' company, Fabrique de Cadrans Sterns Frères, had been a business partner of Patek Philippe as its supplier of watch dials. In 1935, Patek Philippe was brought to American markets by New York-based Henri Stern Watch Agency, where it was sold as a sister brand alongside Universal Genève.

In 1958, Henri Stern, the son of Charles Stern, became the president of Patek Philippe. Alan Banbery, who previously designed Universal's "Compax" movements and worked as a horologist for London's Garrard & Co, would take on the position of Director of Sales in 1965 and later authored official reference books on vintage Patek Philippe pocket watches and chronographs.

Recent development 
In 1993, Philippe Stern, the son of Henry Stern, became the president of the company. He initiated the publication of the twice-a-year Patek Philippe Magazine in 1996, which is reserved for the watch owners and has received contributions from various prominent writers including Nobel Laureates Gao Xingjian and José Saramago. And in 2009, Philippe Stern's son, Thierry Stern, took over the reins from his father. In 2010, the company produced 40,000 timepieces and, according to Thierry Stern, it produced 58,000 pieces in 2017. In 2018, the number went up to 62,000, and in order to maintain quality and exclusivity, Patek Philippe would only slowly increase the number of timepieces produced each year (by 1-3 percent per year) but with a ceiling. Currently, the company is an active member of the Federation of the Swiss Watch Industry FH.

Since 2000s, Patek Philippe timepieces have repeatedly fetched high prices in auctions worldwide. As of 2018, among the world's top ten most expensive watches ever sold at auctions, seven are Patek Philippe watches. Among the top 58 most expensive watches sold at auction (over 2 million US dollars), 46 are Patek Philippe watches. A small part of the demand for auction pieces is driven by Patek Philippe themselves, as they are purchasing in the auction market to add to the collection of the Patek Philippe Museum in Geneva.

Motto and slogan 
One of Patek Philippe's company slogans is "You never actually own a Patek Philippe. You merely look after it for the next generation." The slogan was introduced when the company launched its "Generations" campaign in 1996.

Watch manufacturing 
Patek Philippe manufactures its own watch components. Like other Swiss manufacturers, the company produces mostly mechanical movements with automatic or manual winding mechanism, but has also been producing quartz watches. In fact, Patek Philippe was one of the twenty Swiss watch companies that founded the Centre Electronique Horloger and collaboratively developed the first Swiss quartz movements, such as the Beta 21 movement (1969) which was used by several manufacturers in their watches. In 1950s, the company even produced a prototype for a mechanical digital wristwatch, Ref. 3414.

Patek Philippe popularized complications such as perpetual calendar, split-seconds hand, chronograph, and minute repeater in mechanical watches. In 2009, the company announced that all of its future mechanical timepieces would be imprinted with the Patek Philippe Seal which requires a precision of -3/+2 seconds per day for diameters no less than 20 mm and -5/+4 seconds per day for diameters less than 20 mm, surpassing the highest industry standard of watch manufacturing and thus abandoning the Geneva Seal.

In December 2018, World Wide Fund for Nature (WWF) released a report assigning environmental ratings for 15 major watch manufacturers and jewelers in Switzerland. Patek Philippe was given the lowest environmental rating as "Latecomers/Non-transparent", suggesting the manufacturer has taken few actions addressing the impact of its manufacturing activities on the environment and climate change.

Notable inventions and patents 
Patek Philippe has invented over 20 basic calibres and has received over 100 patents. The following are some of the important contributions from Patek Philippe to the watchmaking industry.

In 1845, patented keyless winding and hand-setting system, which received a bronze medal at the 1844 Industrial Exposition in Paris.
 In 1868, created the first Swiss wristwatch.
 In 1881, patented its precision regulator.
 In 1889, patented perpetual calendar mechanism for pocket watches.
In 1902, patented double chronograph.
In 1916, produced the world's first lady’s wristwatch with complication (No. 174 603, a five-minute repeater).
In 1923, launched the world's first split-second chronograph wristwatch (No. 124 8244).
In 1925, created the world's first perpetual calendar wristwatch (No. 97 975), with a compact movement for pendant watches created in 1898.
In 1933, created the Henry Graves Supercomplication, the most complicated mechanical watch in the world (24 complications) until 1989.
In 1949, patented the Gyromax balance.
In 1956, created the world's first all-electronic clock which, in 1958, received the "Award for Miniaturization” in New York.
In 1962, a tourbillon movement achieves the world's still-unbeaten timekeeping precision record for mechanical watches at Geneva Observatory.
In 1986, patented the secular perpetual calendar with retrograde date indication.
In 1989, created the Calibre 89, the most complicated mechanical watch in the world (33 complications) until 2015.
 In 1996, patented annual calendar mechanism and introduced the first annual calendar model Ref. 5035.
 In 2003/05, launched the annual calendar Ref. 5250, being the world's first watch with silicon-based (the Silinvar alloy) escapement wheel.
In 2006, introduced the silicon-based Spiromax balance spring.
In 2008, introduced the Pulsomax silicon-based escapement.
In 2011, introduced the Oscillomax ensemble, combining the Spiromax balance spring, the Pulsomax escapement, and the GyromaxSi balance.
In 2014, created the Grandmaster Chime Ref. 5175, one of the world's most complicated wristwatches (20 complications).

Notable models

Most expensive pieces

 On November 28, 2012, the Patek Philippe Star Calibre 2000 Ref. 990/1 was sold at Christie's in Hong Kong for a final price of 3.28 million US dollars (HKD 25,300,000), becoming the most expensive timepiece ever auctioned in Asia. The timepiece boasts 21 complications, including Westminster Chimes, minute repeating, lunar orbit and so on, and was made in 2008.
 On November 11, 2014, the Henry Graves Supercomplication was sold at Sotheby's Geneva Auction for a record-breaking US$23.98 million (CHF 23,237,000), becoming the most expensive watch ever sold at auction and held the title until November 9, 2019. The Supercomplication was made in 1933 for the prominent banker Henry Graves Jr. The ultra-complicated pocket watch (having 24 complications) was the result of Graves' friendly horological competition with James Ward Packard. After Graves' death, the watch was held by his daughter, and then by his grandson until 1969, when it was sold to Seth G. Atwood who kept the watch in his renowned "Time Museum" in Rockford, Illinois until 1999. The watch was auctioned for the first time at Sotheby's in December 1999 for a record-breaking US$11 million to Sheikh Saud Bin Mohammed Bin Ali Al-Thani of the Qatari royal family.
 On November 12, 2016, a Patek Philippe Ref. 1518 in steel took the title as the most expensive wristwatch ever sold at auction (until October 2017). Sold through Phillips' Geneva auction house, the watch fetched a final price of US$11.14 million (CHF 11,002,000). This was the first time that a steel-case Ref. 1518 (only four were made in steel) went for auction; in fact, this piece was the first of the four steel Ref.1518 manufactured, which features a chronograph and perpetual calendar.
On November 9, 2019, Patek Philippe Grandmaster Chime Ref. 6300A-010 became the most expensive watch ever sold at auction, fetching US$31 million (CHF 31,000,000) in Christie's Geneva auction.
On December 11, 2021, Patek Philippe Nautilus ref. 5711 with Tiffany blue dial sets a new world record for any wristwatch sold online, realizing US$6.5 million in Phillips New York auction.

Calatrava wristwatch 
In 1932, Patek Philippe launched the first Calatrava model Ref. 96, which was designed by English horologist David Penney who was influenced by the Bauhaus art movement in Germany. Originally, the Stern brothers, soon after they acquired Patek Philippe in 1932, introduced the Calatrava to help the company pass through the Great Depression smoothly.

The original Calatrava Ref. 96 was in production for more than 40 years, and its successor models include Ref. 2526, Ref. 3520, Ref. 5196 and so on. Known for its simple and elegant design, the Calatrava wristwatch has been a flagship model of Patek Philippe since its introduction. Notably, the Calatrava Cross has been company's logo since 1887.

World Time wristwatch 

Patek Philippe World Time (Heures Universelles) collection was introduced in 1939, with Ref.1415 being the first model. The "World Time" complication is able to show the time for all 24 time zones on the same watch and was invented by Swiss watchmaker Louis Cottier in 1931. Cottier's invention attracted several watchmaking companies, while Patek Philippe was the first company to introduce a series of World Time wristwatches after forging a partnership with Mr. Cottier. The successors to Ref. 1415 include Ref. 2523, Ref. 5230, Ref. 5531 (with minute repeater), and so on.

As of 2018, Patek Philippe World Time collection (Ref. 1415, Ref. 2523) holds 6 spots among the 58 world's most expensive watches sold at auction (over 2 million US dollars), with the world record being 4.027 million US dollars (6,603,500 CHF) made at Antiquorum's Geneva auction on April 13, 2002.

Nautilus wristwatch 
In 1976, Patek Philippe introduced the Nautilus collection after deciding it was time to produce an exclusive sport watch with finishes of the highest quality. The first model was Ref. 3700 and was made of steel. It was designed by Swiss watchmaker Gérald Genta, who previously designed the Royal Oak collection for Audemars Piguet, and was released by Patek Philippe during the quartz crisis in the hope that it would help re-attract people's attention to high-end Swiss mechanical watches.

The Nautilus collection played a key role in Patek Philippe's overall marketing strategy as it had to refresh the brand image while perpetuating tradition. The target was represented by dynamic business managers of the new generations. The Nautilus wristwatch has become one of the most popular collections from Patek Philippe, and the Ref. 5711 & 5712 models, which the company introduced in 2006 to celebrate the 30th anniversary of the collection, are among the most popular models.

Perpetual calendar chronograph 
Patek Philippe perpetual calendar chronograph was introduced in 1941, with Ref. 1518 being the first model. On November 12, 2016, a Ref. 1518 in steel became the most expensive wristwatch ever sold at auction (until October 2017), fetching a record-breaking US$11.14 million (11,002,000 CHF) in Geneva (through Phillips' auction house).

As the successor, Ref. 2499 is widely considered to be one of the greatest watch models in the world. Historically, only 349 pieces of Ref. 2499 were made from 1950 to 1985 - around 9 pieces each year. Over the course of 35 years, four series of Ref. 2499 were introduced, exerting a strong influence on the watch designs of many other renowned watchmakers. As of June 2019, Ref. 2499 holds eleven spots among the 59 world's most expensive watches sold at auction (over 2 million US dollars) and at least 18 pieces of Ref. 2499 have been auctioned for more than 1.5 million US dollars, with the world record being 3.880 million US dollars (3,915,000 CHF) made at Sotheby's Geneva auction on November 13, 2018. The successors to Ref. 2499 include, in chronological order, Ref. 3970, Ref. 5970 and Ref. 5270.

Sky Moon Tourbillon 
Patek Philippe Sky Moon Tourbillon wristwatch was introduced in 2001, with Ref. 5002 being the first model. The wristwatch has two dials and contains 12 complications including tourbillon, minute repeater, sky chart, and moon phase & orbit. In 2013, the company introduced the second model of Sky Moon Tourbillon, Ref. 6002, also with 12 complications. The new model took 7 years of research and development, while the engraving on each piece alone took more than 100 hours.

Sky Moon Tourbillon was the most complicated wristwatch from Patek Philippe until 2014. It is estimated that only 3 - 5 pieces are made each year, and the price for each piece is over US$1.2 million. However, every purchase of the piece requires an application from the buyer and has to be approved by Patek Philippe President Thierry Stern. On October 2, 2018, a Sky Moon Tourbillon 6002G was auctioned by Poly Auction in Hong Kong, fetching US$2.707 million (HKD 21,240,000), making it one of the most expensive watches ever sold in auction.

150th anniversary edition
In 1989, Patek Philippe created Calibre 89, then the most complicated mechanical watch ever made, for its 150th anniversary. Calibre 89 holds 33 complications, including the date of Easter, time of sunrise, equation of time, sidereal time, and many other indicators. 1,728 unique parts allow sidereal time, a 2,800 star chart, and more. In addition, Calibre 89 is able to add a day to February for leap years while leaving out the extra day for every 100 year interval.

Only four pieces of Calibre 89 were ever manufactured by Patek Philippe, with one in white gold, one in yellow gold, one in rose gold, and one in platinum. The yellow-gold and the white-gold Calibre 89 were sold at auctions by Antiquorum in 2009 and 2004, respectively, and both watches currently rank among the top ten most expensive watches ever sold at auction, with final prices over 5 million US dollars.

175th anniversary edition 
In 2014, Patek Philippe introduced the Grandmaster Chime Ref. 5175, the most complicated wristwatch ever built by the manufacturer (with 20 complications, but no tourbillon), to celebrate its 175th anniversary. Only seven pieces of Ref. 5175 were created, with one permanently residing in the Patek Philippe Museum in Geneva. The sale price for each of the other six pieces was 2.5 million CHF (2.6 million US dollars).

In 2016, Patek Philippe introduced the Grandmaster Chime Ref. 6300, succeeding the Grandmaster Chime Ref. 5175. Ref. 6300 also has 20 complications, including grande sonnerie, minute repeater, and alarm with time strike (but without tourbillon), with the sale price over 2.2 million US dollars. The purchase of each piece requires an application from the buyer and has to be approved by Patek Philippe President Thierry Stern.

See also
Boule de Genève
List of watch manufacturers
Manufacture d'horlogerie
Patek Philippe Henry Graves Supercomplication
Patek Philippe Calibre 89

References

Further reading 
 Library of reference books on Patek Philippe watches and company - Patek Philippe website
 Kepa, Marek, "Watches for Royalty", Culture.pl, July 27, 2015
 Liu, Ming, "At Patek Philippe, 'the D.N.A. Comes In'", The New York Times, March 17, 2016
 Thompson, Joe, "Family Values: Patek Philippe’s Thierry and Philippe Stern", WatchTime Magazine, August 8, 2012
 Walston, Oliver. "David and Goliath", Lusso magazine, August 8, 2009.
 Mazzardo, Alessandro. "History of the Patek Philippe Nautilus", Time and Watches, Dec 16, 2021.

External links

 

Manufacturing companies established in 1851
Swiss companies established in 1851
Swiss watch brands
Luxury brands
Watch manufacturing companies of Switzerland